KLXN may refer to:

 Jim Kelly Field (ICAO code KLXN)
 KLXN (FM), a radio station (104.1 FM) licensed to serve Rosepine, Louisiana, United States